Lawrence v Commissioner of Police of the Metropolis (otherwise known as R v Lawrence) [1972] AC 262 is an English criminal law case establishing that the appropriation of property — under the meaning of the Theft Act 1968 — can be consented to. The House of Lords here ruled that an appropriation of property can occur even with the consent of the owner. To this end, they commented that the drafter's intentions in leaving out consent from the offence was to relieve the prosecution of establishing a lack of consent.

Facts
Upon arrival at London Victoria railway station an Italian student got into a taxi driven by the defendant. The student then handed the driver a piece of paper with the destination he wished to go to. The taxi driver informed him that it was a long and expensive journey, and proceeded to take £6 from the student's open wallet, ostensibly to cover the fare. Unknown to the student, who was not familiar with the area, the correct fare was just 10s 6d. (52.5p)

Judgment
The House of Lords upheld the earlier judgment of the Court of Appeal, holding that a conviction under section 1 of the Theft Act 1968 was correct. Four elements are required for an offence to fall under section 1:

Viscount Dilhorne interpreted these words as not requiring a lack of consent of the owner, stating that he saw: "no ground for concluding that the omission of the words "without the consent of the owner" was inadvertent and not deliberate," and that Parliament in omitting the words had simply removed the necessity for prosecutions to establish an appropriation was without an owner's consent. On the issue of whether an appropriation could be consented to, Dilhorne elaborated:

See also
 R v Morris
 R v Gomez
 R v Hinks
 Theft Act 1968

References

English criminal case law
House of Lords cases
1971 in case law
1971 in British law
History of the Metropolitan Police